William Fisher may refer to:

Politics, government, military
 William Hayes Fisher, 1st Baron Downham (1853–1920), British politician
 William Fisher (mayor), mayor of Philadelphia, served 1773–1774
 William Fisher (Nova Scotia politician) (1716–1777), farmer and politician in Nova Scotia
 William Fisher (Canadian politician) (1811–1891), merchant and political figure in British Columbia, Canada
 William Fisher (Royal Navy officer) (1780–1852), British naval officer
 William Blake Fisher (1853–1926),  British admiral
 William Wordsworth Fisher (1875–1937), British admiral
 William S. Fisher (Texas), Republic of Texas soldier, leader of the ill-fated 1842 Mier expedition
 Vilyam Genrikhovich Fisher (William August Fisher, 1903–1971), Soviet intelligence officer
 Bill Fisher (1926–2010), Australian judge and President of the New South Wales Industrial Commission
 Bill Fisher (Oregon politician), former Oregon State Senator

Other
 William Webster Fisher (1798–1874), Downing Professor of Medicine at Cambridge University
 William W. Fisher, American legal academic
 William Arms Fisher (1861–1948), American music historian
 William Ellsworth Fisher (1871–1937), American architect
 William Fisher (painter) (1890–1985), American painter
 William Fisher (boxer) (born 1940), Scottish boxer
 William Frederick Fisher (born 1946), American astronaut and emergency physician
 William S. Fisher (born 1958), director of Gap, Inc.
 William Fisher (media executive) (born 1960), media and television executive
 William Fisher, the Kirk Elder of Mauchline, who inspired Burns' poem Holy Willie's Prayer
 Bill Fisher, English vocalist, lead singer of Church of the Cosmic Skull
 Willie Fisher (footballer) (1873–1910), Scottish footballer

See also 
 William Fish (disambiguation)
 William Fischer (disambiguation)